The Indian Heritage Centre is a cultural centre and museum in Singapore that showcases the culture, heritage and history of Indian Singaporeans. Located at the Campbell Lane thoroughfare in the Little India precinct, the  centre was launched on 7 May 2015.

The facade's architectural style is influenced by the baoli (or Indian stepwell), to seek an appreciation of the Indian culture.

References

Ethnic museums in Singapore
Folk museums in Singapore